Gymnobela angulosa is a species of sea snail, a marine gastropod mollusk in the family Raphitomidae.

Description

Distribution
This bathyal marine species was found in the Bougainville Trench, New Guinea

References

 Sysoev, AV. "Ultra-abyssal Findings of Mollusks of the Family Turridae (Gastropoda, Toxoglossa) in the Pacific Ocean" Zoologichesky Zhurnal 67.8 (1988): p. 1122

External links
 

angulosa
Gastropods described in 1988